Hippolyte Dangbeto (born 2 November 1969 in Grand-Popo, Benin) is a French born Beninese former professional football player.

Career 
Dangbeto moved to France with his family at age 8. He began playing youth football with the local club in Trappes before turning professional with RC Paris.

He represented France at under-21 level in 1990 and 1991.

He played in the 1990 and 1999 Coupe de France Finals, but his team lost each of the two.

External links

1969 births
Living people
French footballers
Beninese footballers
France under-21 international footballers
Ligue 1 players
Ligue 2 players
Racing Club de France Football players
Stade Malherbe Caen players
Canet Roussillon FC players
ES Troyes AC players
CS Sedan Ardennes players
People from Mono Department
Association football defenders